Pacificon may refer to:

 Pacificon I, held in Los Angeles in 1946
 Pacificon II, held in Oakland in 1964